Jean-Marie Dufour, OC (born 1949) is an econometrician and statistician from Quebec who teaches at McGill University. He has degrees from McGill University, Université de Montréal, and a PhD in economics from the University of Chicago. He also taught at the Université de Montréal. He is noted for his work on econometric methodology.

Awards 
1988 Prix Marcel-Dagenais
1994 John Rae Prize
2006 Izaak-Walton-Killam Award
2008 Prix Léon-Gérin

References 

Canadian economists
Academics from Montreal
McGill University alumni
Academic staff of McGill University
University of Chicago alumni
Université de Montréal alumni
Academic staff of the Université de Montréal
Living people
1949 births
Fellows of the Econometric Society
Fellows of the American Statistical Association
Officers of the Order of Canada